Africanae may refer to:
 Primitiae Africanae, a botanical book series by Hendrik de Wit

See also
 List of Latin and Greek words commonly used in systematic names#africanum